Taya Straton (27 November 1960 – 26 February 1996) was an Australian actress, who remains best known for her roles in serials and soap opera including Prisoner in 1986, during the final season as Rose "Spider" Simpson. She also had smaller roles in A Country Practice and The Flying Doctors.  She died by suicide in February 1996.

Filmography

Film

Television

References

External links

1960 births
1996 deaths
Australian film actresses
Australian soap opera actresses
Suicides in Australia
Place of birth unknown
20th-century Australian actresses
1996 suicides